The Ability was a wooden Steamer coastal transport cargo ship of 140 tons, owned by Parsons, R & Plunkett. She was scuttled and abandoned off Newcastle, New South Wales on 3 June 1960 or off Sydney on 3 April 1965.

References

Sources

Further reading 
Online Database's
Australian National Shipwreck Database
Australian Shipping - Arrivals and Departures 1788–1968 including shipwrecks 
Encyclopaedia of Australian Shipwrecks - New South Wales Shipwrecks 

Books
Wrecks on the New South Wales Coast. By Loney, J. K. (Jack Kenneth), 1925–1995 Oceans Enterprises. 1993 .
Australian shipwrecks Vol. 4 1901–1986 By Loney, J. K. (Jack Kenneth), 1925–1995. Portarlington Vic. Marine History Publications, 1987 910.4530994 LON
Australian shipwrecks Vol. 5 Update 1986 By Loney, J. K. (Jack Kenneth), 1925–1995. Portarlington Vic. Marine History Publications, 1991 910.4530994 LON

Shipwrecks of the Hunter Region
History of Newcastle, New South Wales
1910 ships